The Adventure series is a collection of children's adventure novels by Willard Price. The original series, comprising 14 novels, was published between 1949 and 1980, and chronicles the adventures of teenagers Hal and Roger Hunt as they travel the world collecting exotic and dangerous animals. Beginning in 2012, Anthony McGowan published four more novels in the series, which featured Hal and Roger's children.

Writing 
Shortly before his death, in 1983, Price wrote that:My aim in writing the Adventure series for young people was to lead them to read by making reading exciting and full of adventure. At the same time I want to inspire an interest in wild animals and their behavior. Judging from the letters I have received from boys and girls around the world, I believe I have helped open to them the worlds of books and natural history.

Characters

Hal and Roger Hunt are the sons of animal collector John Hunt; they have taken a year off school to help capture animals for their father's collection on Long Island, New York, after which the captive specimens are sold to zoos, circuses and safari parks. In Amazon Adventure, the boys' literary debut, Hal is 18 years old and Roger is 13 years old.

Hal is the typical hero: tall, handsome, and muscular, possessing an almost limitless knowledge of natural history and a caring and trusting disposition. Roger, on the other hand, is an ardent practical joker, often mischievous and cheeky but just as resilient and resourceful as his older brother sometimes even more resourceful.

Villains

Each novel in the Adventure series is notable for its memorable selection of loathsome villains and enemies. Some of these, through their interactions with Hal and Roger, are led to redeem their past misdeeds, while others simply suffer the consequences of their actions. Only one character, the cunning "Reverend" Merlin Kaggs, appears as a villain in more than one book.

Revival
In October 2006, the Price family of Holden, Massachusetts entered into an agreement to sell the copyrights and related legal rights for the fourteen Adventure series titles, plus the right to use Price's name, to London-based literary brand owner and investor Fleming Literary Management for an undisclosed six-figure sum.

In July 2011, it was announced that British author Anthony McGowan had been contracted by Puffin Books to write four new books based on Willard Price's classic wildlife adventures series. The first, Leopard Adventure, will see Hal's son Fraser and Roger's daughter Amazon meet for the first time, before sending them off on an adventure to save the rare Amur leopard. Brothers Hal and Roger, who enjoyed a close relationship as teenagers, have fallen out in the new books.

"Hal Hunt has set up this organisation which goes around the world saving species and his son Fraser works with him on that. He's fallen out with Roger who's a freelance conservationist – there's some sibling rivalry there. Hal's slightly hand in hand with big business, he's slightly compromised, and Roger's more of a free spirit," said McGowan, a fan of the Price novels as a child. "Roger and his wife have disappeared and because Amazon's parents have gone missing, Fraser comes to meet her."

Retrospective reviews
David Barnett, writing for The Guardian in 2010, praised the book series, writing that "Price not only knew all the right buttons to press to excite a young reader – exotic locations, nasty villains, wild animals and lashings of peril – but also managed to weave into his adventures a strong yet subtle conservation message."

Novelists David Mitchell and Mark Gatiss have cited the Adventure series as among their favourite childhood books. Anthony Horowitz discovered the Adventure series at age 11, and has cited the series as an influence on his own writing. “If you read Willard Price," said Horowitz, "you’ll find the chemical formula for an Alex Rider book: page-turning, lots of action, lots of activity, good strong characters.”

Analysis 

According to Richard Phillips, who studied the politics of the series, Willard Price acknowledges decolonisation in his writing, but does so through a "conventionally colonial lens." He adds that: Price acknowledges decolonization but reproduces colonialist tropes in his portrayal of Africa. His adventure stories illustrate the sort of geographical literature that critics sought to change, initially to catch up with the facts and values of decolonization, ultimately to contribute to the critical transformation of those facts and values.

Books

Willard Price

Anthony McGowan

References 

Series of children's books